Ding Feng may refer to:

 Ding Feng (general) (丁奉) (died 271), general of the state of Eastern Wu in the Three Kingdoms period of China
 Ding Feng (丁封), the similarly named younger brother of the general Ding Feng (丁奉)
 Ding Feng (sport shooter) (丁峰) (born 1987), Chinese professional sport shooter